Have You Seen Me Lately? is the second stand-up album by American comedian Sam Kinison, released in 1988.

Track listing
The album contains the following tracks:

"Rock Against Drugs?"
"Rubber Love"
"The Story of Jim (Bakker)"
"Robo-Pope"
"Mother Mary's Mystery Date"
"Jesus the Miracle Caterer"
"Heart-Stoppers"
"Buddies"
"Lesbians Are Our Friends"
"Pocket Toys"
"Sexual Diaries"	
"The Butt and the Bible"
"Parties with the Dead"	
"Wild Thing"

References

1988 live albums
Sam Kinison albums
Warner Records live albums
1980s comedy albums